Gilbert Ravanel (26 April 1900 – 1 September 1983) was a French skier. He competed at the 1924 Winter Olympics.

References

External links
 

1900 births
1983 deaths
French male cross-country skiers
French male Nordic combined skiers
French male ski jumpers
Olympic cross-country skiers of France
Olympic Nordic combined skiers of France
Olympic ski jumpers of France
Cross-country skiers at the 1924 Winter Olympics
Nordic combined skiers at the 1924 Winter Olympics
Ski jumpers at the 1924 Winter Olympics
People from Graubünden
20th-century French people